Rapola, Lithuanian for Raphael (given name)
 Frans  Rapola, a Finnish secondary school teacher and politician
 Rapola Castle, a hill fort in Sääksmäki in the municipality of Valkeakoski, Finland